Paradise for Three, titled Romance for Three in the United Kingdom, is a 1938 romantic comedy film starring Frank Morgan as a wealthy industrialist who decides to find out about his German workers by temporarily living among them incognito. It was adapted from Erich Kästner's novel Three Men in the Snow, published in 1934.

Cast
 Frank Morgan as Rudolph Tobler / "Edward Schultz"
 Robert Young as Fritz Hagedorn
 Mary Astor as Irene Mallebre
 Florence Rice as Hilde Tobler / "Hilde Schultz", Rudolph's daughter
 Edna May Oliver as Julia Kunkel
 Reginald Owen as Johann Kesselhut
 Herman Bing as Mr. Polter
 Henry Hull as Sepp
 Sig Ruman as Karl Bold (as Sig Rumann)
 Walter Kingsford as William Reichenbach

See also 
 A Rare Bird (1935)
 Three Men in the Snow (1936)
 Three Men in the Snow (1955)
 Three Men in the Snow (1974)

Reception
According to MGM records, the film earned $421,000 in the US and Canada and $330,000 elsewhere resulting in a profit of $118,000.

References

External links 
 
 
 

1938 films
American black-and-white films
Films based on German novels
Films based on works by Erich Kästner
1938 romantic comedy films
Films directed by Edward Buzzell
Metro-Goldwyn-Mayer films
American romantic comedy films
American remakes of French films
Films set in hotels
Films set in the Alps
American skiing films
1930s English-language films
Films scored by Edward Ward (composer)
1930s American films